Katie Sullivan is an American politician. She is a Democrat representing the 89th district in the Montana House of Representatives.

Political career 

In March 2018, former Representative Dave Severson was appointed to replace Nate McConnell in the Montana House, and decided not to file for election. Sullivan filed for election and won a four-way Democratic primary with 49.8% of the vote. She went on to win the general election with 62.4% of the vote.

In the 2020 general election, Sullivan won the general election and was reelected to the Montana House.

As of July 2020, Sullivan sits on the following committees:
 Energy, Telecommunications, and Federal Relations
 Rules
 Business and Labor
 Agriculture

Electoral history

Personal life 

Sullivan has a degree in human biology from the University of Montana, a JD from the University of Montana School of Law, and an LLM from the University of Colorado.

References 

Year of birth missing (living people)
Living people
Politicians from Missoula, Montana
University of Montana alumni
University of Colorado alumni
Democratic Party members of the Montana House of Representatives
Women state legislators in Montana
21st-century American politicians
21st-century American women politicians